Lover's Leap, or (in plural) Lovers' Leap, is a toponym given to a number of locations of varying height, usually isolated, with the risk of a fatal fall and the possibility of a deliberate jump. Legends of romantic tragedy are often associated with a Lover's Leap.

List of locations

In the United States

 Bluff Park, Hoover, Alabama
 Lovers Leap, DeSoto Caverns, Childersburg, Alabama
 Lovers' Leap, Tombigbee River Mile 96, Jackson, Alabama
 Noccalula Falls Park, Gadsden, Alabama
 Lovers Leap, Green Forest, Arkansas
 Lovers' Leap, Greenwood, Arkansas
 Lovers Leap, Levesque, Arkansas
 Lovers Leap, Knights Ferry, California, alongside California Highway 120
 Lovers' Leap, Lake Tahoe, California
 Quincy, California, off Buck's Lake Road
 Vail, Colorado, name of a run on Blue Sky Basin
 Lovers' Leap Bridge and State Park, New Milford, Connecticut
 Lover's Leap, Yonah Mountain, Georgia
 Rock City, a roadside attraction in Lookout Mountain, Georgia

 Two Lovers Point (Puntan dos Amantes) in Dededo, Guam
 Spirit Lake, Idaho
 Lover's Leap Pere Marquette State Park, Grafton, Illinois
 Lover's Leap, Franklin Creek State Natural Area, Franklin Grove, Illinois
 Starved Rock State Park, Illinois
 Lover's Leap, Carrsville, Kentucky
 Lovers' Leap, Natural Bridge State Resort Park, Slade, Kentucky
 Lovers' Leap Park, Bangor, Maine
 Cumberland Narrows, Maryland
 Purgatory Chasm State Reservation, Massachusetts
 Lovers Leap, Hannibal, Missouri
 Lover's Leap, The Palisades, Weehawken, New Jersey
 Philmont Scout Ranch, outside Cimarron, New Mexico
 Blowing Rock, North Carolina
 Lover's Leap, located along Oklahoma State Highway 10 and the Illinois River in Tahlequah, Oklahoma
 Eagles Mere, Pennsylvania
 Lover's Leap Trail, in Custer State Park, Custer, South Dakota
 Lovers' Leap, in Cameron Park, Waco, Texas
 Lover's Leap, in Lynn, Massachusetts
 Lover's Leap, in Washington County, Utah
 Natural Tunnel State Park, Duffield, Virginia
 Lovers' Leap, Turn Point, Stuart Island, Washington
 Lovers' Leap Hawks Nest State Park, Fayette, West Virginia
 Maiden Rock, Wisconsin
 Whitetop Mountain, Washington County, Virginia

Elsewhere

 Fonte dos Amores, Poços de Caldas, Minas Gerais, Brazil
 Elora Gorge, Elora, Ontario, Canada
 La piedra feliz, Valparaíso, Chile
 Đulin Ponor, Ogulin, Croatia
 Green Valley View aka Suicide Point, Kodaikanal, India
 Lovers' Leap Rock, Dargle Valley, Bray, County Wicklow, Ireland
 Lovers' Leap / Diarmuid and Gráinne's Rock, Loop Head, County Clare, Ireland
 Lovers' Leap, Saint Elizabeth, Jamaica
 Lovers Leap, Otago Peninsula, Dunedin, New Zealand
 Lovers' Rock (la Peña de los Enamorados), Antequera, Andalusia, Spain
 Lovers' Leap, Trincomalee, Sri Lanka
 Lovers' Leap, Blaise castle estate, Bristol, England, United Kingdom
 Lovers' Leap, Dovedale, Peak District, England, United Kingdom

Legends

United States
The promontory was named "Lovers' Leap" by settlers, and has acquired a legend involving two young Native Americans from different tribes. The most notable Native American legend can be found in Lookout Mountain, Georgia. It involved a Chickasaw warrior and a Cherokee maiden.

Blowing Rock Mountain, outside Blowing Rock, North Carolina, has a similar legend of a young lover leaping from the cliff and instead of plunging to his death, is saved. In this version the lover is saved by the blowing wind which sends him back into the arms of his sweetheart.

Wills Mountain has a Lovers' Leap overlooking Cumberland Narrows on the west side of Cumberland, Maryland. The city of Cumberland and the surrounding states of Pennsylvania and West Virginia may be seen from this point.

Mark Twain in Life on the Mississippi writes: "There are fifty Lover's Leaps along the Mississippi from whose summit disappointed Indian girls have jumped." Princess Winona is one such legend, in which the daughter of a Dakota chief leaps to her death rather than marry a suitor she does not love. Maiden Rock, Wisconsin, is one site for the Winona legend, though other locations include  Winona Falls in Pennsylvania, Camden County, Missouri, and Cameron Park in Waco, Texas.

Other
Dovedale in the Peak District in the United Kingdom has a limestone promontory named Lovers' Leap reached by a set of steps built by Italian prisoners of war captured in World War II. The local legend is that a young woman believed her lover had been killed in the Napoleonic wars, so she threw herself off the top of the promontory. Later, her family found out that her lover was alive and well.

Lovers' Leap is named after two enslaved lovers from the 18th century, Mizzy and Tunkey. According to legend, their master, Chardley, liked Mizzy; so, in a bid to have her for himself, he arranged for her lover, Tunkey, to be sold to another estate. Mizzy and Tunkey fled to avoid being separated but were eventually chased to the edge of a large steep cliff. Rather than face being caught and separated, the lovers embraced and jumped over the cliff. The story was used as the basis for a romantic novel.

See also
 List of suicide sites
 Suicide bridge

References

Further reading
 Lover's Leap: Based on the Jamaican Legend, Horane Smith, Minerva Press (June 1, 1999), 
 Legends of Lover's Leaps, Phil Hoebing, Missouri Folklore Society Journal 21 (1999), 81–98.
 Lover's Leap Legends: From Sappho of Lesbos to Wah-Wah-Tee of Waco, Payton, Leland & Crystal, Lens & Pen Press (February 1, 2020), 

Folklore
Landforms of Fayette County, West Virginia
History of West Virginia
Places located in Cumberland, MD-WV-PA
Suicide methods
Cliffs